Bangarmau is a big city with Tehsil Bangarmau (earlier in Safipur), in the Unnao district, Uttar Pradesh, India. It is located on high ground overlooking the left bank of the Kalyani river, about 50 km northwest of Unnao and 22 km northwest of Safipur. Roads fan out in all directions from Bangarmau, including the main Unnao-Hardoi road that passes through town. Major commodities produced here include wheat flour, rice, and pulses. As of 2011, the population of Bangarmau is 44,204, in 7,600 households.

Bangarmau is a central point for local agricultural trade that serves as the main market for the nearby villages. It is connected to Delhi via the Agra Lucknow Expressway (475 km), Lucknow (65 km), Kanpur (70 km) (connected with the rail line from Balamau to Kanpur), Unnao (50 km), Hardoi (65 km) and Bareilly (197 km) by highways.

Bangarmau is a pilgrim center. A  temple, Raj Rajeshwari Mandir, was established in the early nineteenth century. An old temple named Baba Bodheswar is also situated west of the town. Near Bangarmau is Sanchan Kot, where in 2009, an Archaeological Survey of India excavation unearthed a 2000-year-old Shiva temple.

Bangarmau has the largest market with bill sales in Unnao District. Early in 1920s there were the main families of Bangarmau: the Mikrani(mukeri) Katiyar, Kurmi, Patel, Jaiswal, Chowdhurys, and the Baniyas and Dhobis.

History 
Bangarmau was the first Muslim settlement in the area of present-day Unnao district, dating back to around the year 1300. According to legend, the town was founded when a Muslim holy man named Sayyid Ala-ud-Din attempted to take up residence near the town of Nawal, which was ruled by a Hindu raja named Nal. The raja refused and sent men to expel him by force, but Ala-ud-Din laid a curse on them so that the raja and all his people died, and the town of Nawal was turned upside-down. The modern village of Nawal is built on top of its ruins, and old artifacts are still sometimes dug up.

Sayyid Ala-ud-Din then went on to found the city of Bangarmau, which is where he was buried after he died. A shrine was built over his grave, and it has an inscription dated to 702 AH, or 1302 CE. Ala-ud-Din's descendants remain custodians of the shrine, which at one point was "rich and famous" before declining by the turn of the 20th century.

Despite Bangarmau's Muslim origin and prominent shrine, though, it never became thoroughly Islamised, and the population remains mostly Hindu.

Bangarmau is referred to in the Baburnama, the autobiography of Babur, where Babur mentions that he camped near a lake situated in Bangarmau on 15 March 1528 and the following day left for Lucknow. Bangarmau belongs to the area under influence of a Sufi saint Madar Shah of the Madaria sect. Several villages named are after him situated around Bangarmau.

Bangarmau's population steadily declined during the second half of the 19th century.

At the turn of the 20th century, Bangarmau was described as a well-built town almost surrounded by extensive orchards; about half the houses were built with brick. It had 16 mosques and several Hindu temples, as well as a police station and a middle school with 120 students. The town held markets twice weekly, on Tuesdays and Saturdays; its commerce was helped by its advantageous location at a crossroads.

Demographics 

According to the 2011 census, Bangarmau has a population of 44,204 people, of which 22,985 are male and 21,219 are female. Males constitute 52% of the population and females 48%. The population of children between the ages of 0-6 is 5,649, which is 12.78% of the total population. The sex ratio of this group is 941 females to every 1000 males, which is higher than the urban average for Unnao district. Members of Scheduled Castes make up 9.48% of Bangarmau's population, while no members of scheduled tribes were recorded. The town's literacy rate was 68.4% (counting only people age 7 and up); literacy was higher among men and boys (73.2%) than among women and girls (63.0%).

22.5% of Bangarmau residents were classified as main workers (i.e. people employed for at least 6 months per year) in 2011. Marginal workers (i.e. people employed for less than 6 months per year) made up 7.9%, and the remaining 69.6% were non-workers. Employment status varied substantially according to gender, with 47.8% of men being either main or marginal workers, compared to only 11.5% of women.
-->

Famous places 
Most important place is Rajrajeshwari Temple near bank of river Kalyani in the south of the town. Other important place is Bodheswar Mahadev Temple. Satpith Mata bhuvneshwari Mandir Bangarmau sabji mandi mein sthit hai
The prehistoric stone tools of great archaeological importance have been found in Bangarmau town.
Bangarmau is trade centre of Agriculture commodities. Sandi bird sanctuary is about 25 km from the town. Holy river Ganga and its ghat (river bank) is about 15 km from the town.

Education 
Schools and colleges:

 Indira Gandhi Rajkeeya Degree College
 Subhash Inter College
 St.Aloysius School Alampur Retwa, Bangarmau, Unnao.
 Rani Vidya Mandir School Bangarmau Unnao
 Bal Vidya Mandir School, Near Maa Hospital, Bangarmau Unnao
 Maya International School, Near Tehsil
 Pratima Inter College Bangarmau Unnao
 R.S. Inter College
 Shri Ram Public School for kids
 R.D.S Inter College New Katra
 Shri Durgeshvar Vidya Mandir
 Madrasa Ahle Sunnat Gousul Uloom Mukariyana
 K.D.S. Public School Bhatpuri
 New National Public School Purviya tola Bangarmau
 B.D.S.R. Inter College Radheshyam Nagar Kanpur Hardoi Bypass near Power House Bangarmau
 P.J.P Higher Secondary School (kasba tola Bangarmau Unnao)
 Indira Gandhi Government PG College
 Gautam Buddha Mahavidyalay (College), Ismailpur, Ambapara, Bangarmau

Villages 
Bangarmau CD block has the following 82 villages:

References 

Cities and towns in Unnao district